Morioka Station is a railway station in Morioka, Iwate Prefecture, Japan. It is operated by JR East.

Lines
Morioka Station is a major junction station, and is where the Akita Shinkansen splits off from the Tōhoku Shinkansen. It is located 535.3 km from Tokyo Station. Local JR East services are provided by the Tohoku Main Line, Tazawako Line and Yamada Line, all of which terminate at Morioka Station. The station is also the southern terminus of the third-sector Iwate Ginga Railway Line.

Station layout
The station has three elevated island platforms for Shinkansen services, and four island platforms for local services. The station has a Midori no Madoguchi staffed ticket office.

Platforms

History
The station was opened on November 1, 1890, by Japan's first private railway company, Nippon Railway. The line was nationalized in 1906. Services on the Tazawako Line started in 1921, on the Yamada line in 1923, the Tohoku Shinkansen in 1982 and the Akita Shinkansen in 1997. The station was absorbed into the JR East network upon the privatization of the Japanese National Railways (JNR) on 1 April 1987.

Passenger statistics
In fiscal 2015, the JR East portion of the station was used by an average of 17,784 passengers daily (boarding passengers only). The Iwate Ginga Railway portion of the station was used by an average of 3,257 passengers daily.

Surrounding area

East exit 
 Morioka Station building "Fezan"
 Moriokaekimae Post office
 JR East Morioka branch office
 JR bus Tōhoku Morioka branch office

West exit
Iwate Asahi Television Co., Ltd.

Connecting bus routes

Local 
JR Bus Tōhoku
For Kuji Station via Iwate-Numakunai Station and Kuzumaki
For Iwaizumi via Hayasaka-Kōgen
Iwate-Kenhoku Bus
For Miyako Station ("Route 106 Express Bus")
For Iwate-Funakoshi Station via Miyako Station ("Route 106 Express Bus")
For Numakunai via Kuriyagawa Station and Iwate-Shibutami
Iwate Kenkotsu Bus
For Ōfunato via Setamai
For Hanamaki Airport

Long-distance (Highway bus)
Departs from the west exit
For Aomori Station via Kosaka ("Asunaro")
For Hirosaki Bus Terminai via Tohoku-Ōwani ("Yodel")
For Hachinohe Rapia via Kunohe ("Hassei")
For Sendai Station ("Urban")
For Karumai or Ōno ("Win day")
For Lake Towada ("Towadako")
For　Tamachi Station (Tokyo) via Tokyo Station ("Iwate Kizuna")

Departs from the east exit
For Ōdate Station via Kazuno-Hanawa Station ("Michinoku")
For Jōboji or Ninohe Station ("Super Yūyū")
For Tokyo Station via Ikebukuro Station ("Rakuchin", All reserved seats)
For Hon-Atsugi Station via Yokohama Station, Machida Station

See also
 List of railway stations in Japan

References

External links

  (JR East) 
 IGR Station information  

Railway stations in Japan opened in 1890
Railway stations in Iwate Prefecture
Tōhoku Shinkansen
Akita Shinkansen
Tōhoku Main Line
Iwate Galaxy Railway Line
Tazawako Line
Yamada Line (JR East)
Morioka, Iwate